A dumpster is a movable waste container designed to be brought and taken away by a special collection vehicle, or to a bin that a specially designed garbage truck lifts, empties into its hopper, and lowers, on the spot. The word is a generic trademark of Dumpster, an American brand name for a specific design. Generic usage of skip or skip bin is common in the UK, Australia and Ireland, as Dumpster is neither an established nor well-known brand in those countries.

History
The word "dumpster", first used commercially in 1936, came from the Dempster-Dumpster system of mechanically loading the contents of standardized containers onto garbage trucks, which was patented by Dempster Brothers in 1935. The containers were called Dumpsters, a blending of the company's name with the word dump. The Dempster Dumpmaster, which became the first successful front-loading garbage truck that used this system, popularized the word.

The word dumpster has had at least three trademarks associated with it by Dempster Brothers, but today it is often used as a genericized trademark. All three trademarks have since either been expired or cancelled.

Function

 
The main purpose of a dumpster is to store garbage until it is emptied by a garbage truck and disposed of. Dumpsters can be used for all kinds of waste, or for recycling purposes. Most dumpsters are emptied weekly by a hired garbage removal service.

Most dumpsters are emptied by front-loading garbage trucks. These trucks have large prongs on the front which are aligned and inserted into arms (or slots) on the dumpster. Hydraulics then lift the prongs and the dumpster, eventually flipping the dumpster upside-down and emptying its contents into the garbage truck hopper (storage compartment). Other dumpsters are smaller and are emptied by rear-loading trucks.

Ninety-five gallon dumpsters (also known as "roll carts" or "toters") are used by small businesses and homes where a normal bin would be too small, but a regular dumpster would be too large. These are emptied by rear-loading trucks or by side-loading trucks purpose-built for emptying roll carts of this and smaller sizes.

Mobile construction dumpsters are  dumpster trailers called "roadrunners", and are commonly used on smaller remodeling jobs or for garage or lawn clean-outs.

Roll-off/containers/dumpsters/opentop containers are just a few of the names given to these large capacity receptacles. These containers are normally carried by very large trucks with hydraulic arms which load and unload the containers with ease, thus allowing these trucks to place these containers in a relatively unobtrusive position.

Roll-off dumpsters are available in a variety of sizes to fit different situations.  The size needed will generally depend on the following three factors: 1) volume of material, 2) type of material 3) location or placement of the dumpster.  For example, heavy materials like bricks or stones should be placed in smaller dumpsters so the loaded container does not exceed weight limits for transportation.

Dumpster diving

Dumpster diving involves persons voluntarily climbing into a dumpster to find valuables, such as discarded metal scrap, or simply useful items, including food and used clothing. It can also be a method of investigation (e.g., looking for discarded financial records, private papers, or evidence of a crime). Going through garbage containers that are not strictly speaking dumpsters is nevertheless often referred to as dumpster diving.

See also

Dump truck
Dumpster fire
Roll-off
Shipping container
 Skip (container)
Waste
Waste container
Waste management

References

External links

Brands that became generic
Waste containers
Articles containing video clips